Sir Richard Wynn, 2nd Baronet (1588 – 19 July 1649) was a Welsh courtier and politician who sat in the House of Commons at various times between 1614 and 1649.

Biography
Wynn was the second and eldest surviving son of Sir John Wynn, 1st Baronet, and his wife Sidney, daughter of William Gerard, Lord Chancellor of Ireland. He was a Member of Parliament for Caernarvonshire in 1614. He was Groom of the Bedchamber to Charles, Prince of Wales, from 1617 to 1625. He unsuccessfully contested Caernarvonshire in 1621 but in the same election he returned as MP for Ilchester.

Wynn accompanied Prince Charles on his voyage to Spain in 1623 and wrote an account of the journey, published by Thomas Hearne in 1729. He describes the costumes of Spanish country people and aristocrats. In 1625, he was elected MP for Ilchester again. He was also appointed treasurer to Queen Henrietta Maria. He inherited the baronetcy after the death of his father in 1627. In 1629, he was once again groom of the bedchamber to Charles (now crowned King Charles I) and Henrietta Maria. He established the Gwydir chapel in Llanrwst church and had a bridge built over the River Conwy in 1633.

In April 1640, Wynn was elected MP for Andover, for Newton and for Bodmin in the Short Parliament and chose to sit for Andover. He was elected MP for Liverpool for the Long Parliament in November 1640. He sat in parliament until 1648 when he was excluded under Pride's Purge and died a few months later in 1649.

He married Anne, daughter of Sir Francis D'Arcy of Isleworth and Katherine Legh, but had no issue. The baronetcy passed to his brother Owen.

Notes

References

Further reading

 
 

 

Wynn, Richard
Wynn, Richard
Wynn, Richard
Wynn, Sir Richard, 2nd Baronet
Members of the Parliament of England (pre-1707) for constituencies in Wales
Members of the pre-1707 English Parliament for constituencies in Cornwall
Members of the Parliament of England (pre-1707) for Liverpool
English MPs 1614
English MPs 1621–1622
English MPs 1625
English MPs 1640 (April)
English MPs 1640–1648